George H. Love (September 4, 1900 – July 25, 1991) was a businessman and industrialist who was in control of two major corporations—the Consolidation Coal Company and the Chrysler Corporation—and lead both back to profitability.

Early life

Love was born in Pennsylvania. He attended Phillips Exeter Academy and Princeton University, and then, unable to immediately find work, became a miner and overseer in one of his family's coal mines. Later, he went on to get his MBA from Harvard University. and spent two years as a broker in the investment field before an uncle put him in charge of three family-owned coal mines in Pennsylvania. Also during this time he was active in other areas—in 1926, he was a vice-president of Pittsburgh Union collieries, and in 1933 he became president.

Consolidation Coal Company

After Love was able to turn things around at the first three mines, Love took control of his uncle's struggling Consolidation Coal Company in total in the year 1944. He turned things around by a series of mergers and acquisitions, through which he was able to broaden the economies of scale. His mergers, with Pittsburgh Coal and the M. A. Hanna Company, end up creating (at the time) the country's largest coal company. His process improvements included focusing on industrial sales rather than private distribution, major changes in the safety requirements of coal mining, removing primitive implements such as mules and picks with modern mechanical equipment. He left the helm in 1956.

Union Efforts

Love was well known for his even-handed and fair negotiations with union leader John Lewis and the United Mine Workers group. After his retirement, he was a chief negotiator for the coal industry as a whole with labor, leading to a 13-year period of labor peace.

Chrysler Corporation

In 1958, George Love decided he was going to get back into business. Already a multimillionaire, he became a member of the board of directors of Chrysler, which had suffered in losing a large portion of the automobile market after World War II. In 1961, Love selected Lynn A. Townsend as president of the company, and Chrysler's fortunes were quickly reversed. Even in the 1940s, Love's coal companies were heavily invested in Chrysler, owning almost 8 percent of the automaker's stock. Eventually Love became chairman of the board in 1965, where he remained until his second retirement in 1970.

He died, due to complications from emphysema, in 1991.

Interests
Love purchased a section of Walter Evans Edge's Sunny Hill Plantation in Leon County, Florida and named it Loveridge Plantation. Love used this for quail hunting.

References

1900 births
1991 deaths
Businesspeople from Pennsylvania
Princeton University alumni
Harvard Business School alumni
American energy industry businesspeople
Deaths from emphysema
20th-century American businesspeople